Pramod Bhagat (born 4 June 1988) is an Indian professional Para-badminton player from Vaishali district, Bihar. He is currently ranked world number 2 in para-badminton men's singles SL3, and won a gold medal at the 2020 Summer Paralympics in Men's singles SL3.

Early life 
Pramod was born on 4 June 1988 in Hajipur, Vaishali district, Bihar. He is one of six brothers and sisters. When he was five years old he developed polio, leading to a disability affecting his left leg. At the age of 13, he went to watch a badminton match and was fascinated with the game. For the next 2 years, he was deeply engulfed in the game with footwork, fitness, and fixture of the game. Pramod played his first tournament against normal category players when he was 15 years old. He was encouraged by spectators, which motivated him to move ahead in his badminton career.

Achievements

Paralympic Games 
Men's singles SL3

World Championships 

Men's singles

Men's doubles

IWAS World Games 

Men's singles

Men's doubles

Mixed doubles

Asian Para Games 

Men's singles

Men's doubles

Asian Championships 
Men's singles

Men's doubles

BWF Para Badminton World Circuit (8 titles, 5 runners-up) 
The BWF Para Badminton World Circuit – Grade 2, Level 1, 2 and 3 tournaments has been sanctioned by the Badminton World Federation from 2022.

Men's singles

Men's doubles

Mixed doubles

International Tournaments (18 titles, 10 runners-up) 
Men's singles

Men's doubles

Mixed doubles

Medals

International medals

* Statistics were last updated on 24 March 2020.

Awards
 2019 – Arjuna Award
 2019 – Biju Patnaik Sports Award Odisha
 2021 – Khel Ratna Award, highest sporting honour of India.
 2022 - Padma Shri

References

Notes 

1988 births
Living people
People from Bargarh district
Racket sportspeople from Odisha
Indian disabled sportspeople
Indian male badminton players
Indian male para-badminton players
Disabled
Sports
Recipients of the Arjuna Award
Paralympic badminton players of India
Badminton players at the 2020 Summer Paralympics
Paralympic gold medalists for India
Paralympic medalists in badminton
Medalists at the 2020 Summer Paralympics
Recipients of the Khel Ratna Award
Recipients of the Padma Shri in sports